The 1953 Tasmanian Australian National Football League (TANFL) premiership season was an Australian Rules football competition staged in Hobart, Tasmania, over fifteen (15) roster rounds and four (4) finals series matches between 18 April and 19 September 1953.

Participating Clubs
Clarence District Football Club
New Town District Football Club
Hobart Football Club
New Norfolk District Football Club
North Hobart Football Club
Sandy Bay Football Club

1953 TANFL Club Coaches
Les McClements (Clarence)
Jack Rough (Glenorchy)
Bill Tonks (Hobart)
Arthur Olliver (New Norfolk)
Len McCankie (North Hobart)
Gordon Bowman (Sandy Bay)

TANFL Reserves Grand Final
Nth Hobart 8.15 (63) v Sandy Bay 8.4 (52) – North Hobart Oval

TANFL Under-19's Grand Final
State Schools Old Boys Football Association (SSOBFA) 
Macalburn 6.11 (47) v Buckingham 2.8 (20) – North Hobart Oval

Intrastate Matches
Jubilee Shield (Saturday, 30 May 1953) 
NWFU 19.13 (127) v TANFL 17.18 (120) – Att: 7,832 at North Hobart Oval

Jubilee Shield (Tuesday, 2 June 1953) 
TANFL 12.19 (91) v NTFA 12.19 (91) – Att: 10,462 at North Hobart Oval
 
Jubilee Shield (Saturday, 11 July 1953) 
NTFA 16.16 (112) v TANFL 15.16 (106) – Att: 5,732 at York Park

Jubilee Shield (Saturday, 18 July 1953) 
NWFU 13.21 (99) v TANFL 9.28 (82) – Att: N/A at West Park Oval

Inter-Association Match (Saturday, 30 May 1953) 
TANFL II 14.15 (99) v Huon FA 12.9 (81) – Att: 7,832 at North Hobart Oval *
Note: This match was a curtain-raiser to the TANFL v NWFU fixture.

Interstate Matches
See: 1953 Australian National Football Carnival

Match One (Wednesday, 8 July 1953) 
VFA 11.18 (84) v Tasmania 5.11 (41) – Att: 9,500 at Adelaide Oval

Match Three (Sunday, 12 July 1953) 
Victoria 22.20 (152) v Tasmania 2.8 (20) – Att: 36,500 at Adelaide Oval (Double-Header)

Match Six (Monday, 13 July 1953) 
South Australia 19.13 (127) v Tasmania 17.15 (117) – Att: 8,600 at Adelaide Oval

Match Eight (Thursday, 16 July 1953) 
Western Australia 12.19 (91) v Tasmania 5.7 (37) – Att: N/A at Adelaide Oval

Exhibition Match (Saturday, 18 July 1953) 
Geelong 17.24 (126) v TANFL 8.13 (61) – Att: 4,096 at North Hobart Oval

Lightning Premiership Matches
(Sunday, 12 July 1953) 
Hobart 3.4 (22) v New Town 1.2 (8)
New Norfolk 3.6 (24) v Sandy Bay 3.1 (19)
Clarence 3.3 (21) v Nth Hobart 3.2 (20)
Hobart 2.3 (15) v Clarence 0.7 (7) (semi-final)
New Norfolk 4.6 (30) v Hobart 4.1 (25) (Grand Final)
Attendance: 1,933 at North Hobart Oval

Leading Goalkickers: TANFL
Bert Shaw (Sandy Bay) – 51
Bernie Waldron (Hobart) – 47
Terry Cashion (Sandy Bay) – 47
Max Walker (Hobart) – 42
Rex Garwood (New Town) – 41
N.Richardson (Clarence) – 41

Medal Winners
Terry Cashion (Sandy Bay) – William Leitch Medal
T.Maddox (New Norfolk) – George Watt Medal (Reserves)
Athol Unsworth (Macalburn) – V.A Geard Medal (Under-19's)
John Golding (Hobart) – Weller Arnold Medal (Best TANFL player in Interstate Matches)

1953 TANFL Ladder

Round 1
(Saturday, 18 April 1953) 
Hobart 12.14 (86) v Clarence 11.11 (77) – Att: 2,916 at North Hobart Oval
New Town 18.10 (118) v Sandy Bay 16.14 (110) – Att: 2,302 at Queenborough Oval
New Norfolk 12.11 (83) v Nth Hobart 9.25 (79) – Att: 1,899 at Boyer Oval

Round 2
(Saturday, 2 May 1953) 
Hobart 27.13 (175) v Nth Hobart 16.15 (111) – Att: 3,507 at North Hobart Oval
New Town 14.22 (106) v New Norfolk 8.14 (62) – Att: 2,167 at New Town Oval
Sandy Bay 15.19 (109) v Clarence 11.14 (80) – Att: 2,129 at Bellerive Oval

Round 3
(Saturday, 9 May 1953) 
Sandy Bay 13.18 (96) v New Norfolk 5.8 (38) – Att: 2,058 at North Hobart Oval
Hobart 16.9 (105) v New Town 16.9 (105) – Att: 3,235 at TCA Ground
Clarence 9.12 (66) v Nth Hobart 7.14 (56) – Att: 1,285 at Bellerive Oval

Round 4
(Saturday, 16 May 1953)  
Sandy Bay 20.11 (131) v Nth Hobart 14.6 (90) – Att: 2,952 at North Hobart Oval
Hobart 25.18 (168) v New Norfolk 10.12 (72) – Att: 1,171 at TCA Ground
Clarence 18.13 (121) v New Town 12.25 (97) – Att: 1,980 at New Town Oval

Round 5
(Saturday, 23 May 1953) 
New Town 9.15 (69) v Nth Hobart 6.9 (45) – Att: 2,395 at North Hobart Oval
Hobart 10.9 (69) v Sandy Bay 9.12 (66) – Att: 2,731 at Queenborough Oval
Clarence 5.20 (50) v New Norfolk 5.15 (45) – Att: 1,292 at Boyer Oval

Round 6
(Saturday, 6 June 1953) 
New Norfolk 16.8 (104) v Nth Hobart 13.15 (93) – Att: 1,510 at North Hobart Oval
Hobart 15.24 (114) v Clarence 7.9 (51) – Att: 1,715 at TCA Ground
New Town 11.15 (81) v Sandy Bay 9.24 (78) – Att: 2,287 at New Town Oval

Round 7
(Saturday, 13 June 1953) 
Sandy Bay 11.8 (74) v Clarence 8.9 (57) – Att: 1,456 at North Hobart Oval
Hobart 16.18 (114) v Nth Hobart 7.10 (52) – Att: 818 at TCA Ground
New Town 9.10 (64) v New Norfolk 8.14 (62) – Att: 1,087 at Boyer Oval

Round 8
(Saturday, 20 June 1953) 
Nth Hobart 16.14 (110) v Clarence 14.11 (95) – Att: 1,612 at North Hobart Oval
Sandy Bay 20.14 (134) v New Norfolk 7.12 (54) – Att: 1,565 at Queenborough Oval
New Town 18.14 (122) v Hobart 12.5 (77) – Att: 2,488 at New Town Oval

Round 9
(Saturday, 27 June 1953) 
New Town 14.16 (100) v Clarence 11.11 (77) – Att: 2,248 at North Hobart Oval
Sandy Bay 17.17 (119) v Nth Hobart 6.13 (49) – Att: 2,028 at Queenborough Oval
Hobart 16.16 (112) v New Norfolk 7.4 (46) – Att: 957 at Boyer Oval

Round 10
(Saturday, 4 July 1953) 
Sandy Bay 16.10 (106) v Hobart 15.9 (99) – Att: 3,967 at North Hobart Oval
New Town 16.19 (115) v Nth Hobart 7.16 (58) – Att: 1,461 at New Town Oval
New Norfolk 11.13 (79) v Clarence 10.13 (73) – Att: 892 at Bellerive Oval

Round 11
(Saturday, 25 July 1953) 
Sandy Bay 19.13 (127) v New Town 11.13 (79) – Att: 3,264 at North Hobart Oval
Nth Hobart 13.15 (93) v New Norfolk 12.15 (87) – Att: 766 at TCA Ground
Hobart 11.17 (83) v Clarence 10.10 (70) – Att: 847 at Bellerive Oval

Round 12
(Saturday, 1 August 1953) 
Nth Hobart 12.7 (79) v Hobart 10.17 (77) – Att: 1,894 at North Hobart Oval
Sandy Bay 15.8 (98) v Clarence 9.17 (71) – Att: 1,745 at Queenborough Oval
New Town 18.9 (117) v New Norfolk 10.9 (69) – Att: 1,210 at New Town Oval

Round 13
(Saturday, 8 August 1953) 
Hobart 13.9 (87) v New Town 11.11 (77) – Att: 3,152 at North Hobart Oval
Clarence 14.16 (100) v Nth Hobart 6.8 (44) – Att: 1,056 at Bellerive Oval
New Norfolk 6.11 (47) v Sandy Bay 7.3 (45) – Att: 1,205 at Boyer Oval

Round 14
(Saturday, 15 August 1953) 
Sandy Bay 21.14 (140) v Nth Hobart 9.11 (65) – Att: 2,017 at North Hobart Oval
Hobart 12.10 (82) v New Norfolk 10.13 (73) – Att: 1,352 at TCA Ground
Clarence 9.9 (63) v New Town 7.12 (54) – Att: 1,537 at Bellerive Oval

Round 15
(Saturday, 22 August 1953) 
New Town 14.17 (101) v Nth Hobart 12.5 (77) – Att: 1,283 at North Hobart Oval
Hobart 12.13 (85) v Sandy Bay 11.8 (74) – Att: 2,485 at TCA Ground
New Norfolk 9.14 (68) v Clarence 7.7 (49) – Att: 1,339 at Boyer Oval

First Semi Final
(Saturday, 29 August 1953) 
Sandy Bay: 3.5 (23) | 6.6 (42) | 11.8 (74) | 14.12 (96)
Clarence: 1.2 (8) | 5.7 (37) | 8.9 (57) | 9.12 (66)
Attendance: 6,034 at North Hobart Oval

Second Semi Final
(Saturday, 5 September 1953) 
New Town: 4.4 (28) | 6.4 (40) | 9.7 (61) | 11.10 (76)
Hobart: 0.3 (3) | 1.4 (10) | 2.8 (20) | 4.9 (33)
Attendance: 4,017 at North Hobart Oval

Preliminary Final
(Saturday, 12 September 1953) 
Sandy Bay: 3.1 (19) | 6.2 (38) | 10.4 (64) | 13.5 (83)
Hobart: 1.2 (8) | 3.6 (24) | 5.7 (37) | 8.12 (60)
Attendance: 7,993 at North Hobart Oval

Grand Final
(Saturday, 19 September 1953) 
New Town: 6.2 (38) | 10.9 (69) | 13.13 (91) | 16.18 (114)
Sandy Bay: 7.2 (44) | 8.7 (55) | 12.11 (83) | 15.13 (103)
Attendance: 11,860 at North Hobart Oval

Source: All scores and statistics courtesy of the Hobart Mercury publication.

Tasmanian Football League seasons